Abraxas sinopicaria is a species of moth belonging to the family Geometridae. It was described by Wehrli in 1934. The species habitates around Sichuan, China.

References

Abraxini
Moths of Asia
Moths described in 1934